is a UK company law case on an action for unfair prejudice under s.459 Companies Act 1985 (now s.994 Companies Act 2006). It is the only case thus far in the House of Lords on the provision and it deals with the concept of members of a business having their "legitimate expectations" disappointed.

Facts
Mr Phillips owned a company called Pectel Ltd. It specialised in stripping asbestos from buildings. Mr O'Neill started to work for the company in 1983. In 1985, Phillips was so impressed with O'Neill's work that he made him a director and gave him 25% of the shares. They had an informal chat in May 1985, and Mr Phillips said that one day, he hoped Mr O'Neill could take over the whole management, and would then be allowed to draw 50% of the company's profits. This happened, Phillips retired and O'Neill took over management. There were further talks about increasing O'Neill's actual shareholding to 50%, but this did not happen. After five years the construction industry went into decline, and so did the company. Phillips came back in and took business control. He demoted O'Neill to be a branch manager of the German operations and withdrew O'Neill's share of the profits. O'Neill was miffed. He started up his own competing company in Germany in 1990 and then he filed a petition for unfairly prejudicial conduct against Phillips, firstly, for the termination of equal profit-sharing and, secondly, for repudiating the alleged agreement for the allotment of more shares.

The judge rejected the petition on both grounds. There had been no firm agreement for an increase in shareholding, and it was not unfair for Phillips to keep a majority of company shares. Also, it was held that O'Neill suffered nothing in his capacity as a member of the company. His shares were unaffected. It was merely a dispute about his status as an employee. He had been well rewarded. In the Court of Appeal, Nourse LJ (with whom Potter and Mummery LJJ agreed) O'Neill won his appeal. Nourse LJ said that in fact Phillips had created a legitimate expectation for the shares in future. Moreover, a global view of the relationship should be taken, and so O'Neill did suffer as a member. On further appeal to the House of Lords, the Court of Appeal was overturned, and Phillips won.

Judgment
Lord Hoffmann gave the leading judgment, with which Lords Jauncey, Clyde, Hutton and Hobhouse concurred. The most important feature of the case was that Mr Phillips had never actually agreed to transfer Mr O'Neill the shares of the company, so it could not be unfair that he had decided not to, because he had never decided to actually do so. Lord Hoffmann also recanted on his previous use of the terminology of "legitimate expectations". "I meant that it could exist only when equitable principles... would make it unfair for a party to exercise rights under the articles." As to capacity, although irrelevant after deciding that there had been no agreement, disagreeing with the first instance judge, Lord Hoffmann pointed out that O'Neill may have had a claim in his capacity of shareholder (rather than just an employee) because he had invested his money and his time into the company.

See also
UK company law

Notes

External links
Full text of judgment from the Parliamentary Publications website.

United Kingdom company case law
1999 in British law
1999 in case law
House of Lords cases